Scotland national field hockey team may refer to:
 Scotland men's national field hockey team
 Scotland women's national field hockey team